Cimarosa is a surname. Notable people with the surname include:

Domenico Cimarosa (1749–1801), Italian composer
Tano Cimarosa, born Gaetano Cisco (1922–2008), Italian actor, screenwriter, and film director

See also
Cima Rossa, a mountain in Switzerland